Guangzhou Opera House Station is a metro station on the APM line of the Guangzhou Metro. It is located underground at the intersection of Huajiu Road, Zhujiang East Road and Zhujiang West Road, to the northeast of Guangzhou Opera House and the northwest of the Guangdong Museum. It started operation on 8 November 2010.

Station layout

Exits

References

Railway stations in China opened in 2010
Guangzhou Metro stations in Tianhe District